The 1978–79 New York Rangers season was the franchise's 53rd season. The highlight of the season was participating in the Stanley Cup Finals, as the Rangers played 12 consecutive playoff games without losing in regulation.

Offseason
The Rangers fired their general manager John Ferguson and head coach Jean-Guy Talbot, replacing them with former Philadelphia Flyers and two-time Stanley Cup-winning coach Fred Shero.

The Rangers signed forwards Anders Hedberg and Ulf Nilsson away from the WHA's Winnipeg Jets.

The Rangers chose Don Maloney with their first pick, in the second-round, 26th over-all. Maloney was the younger brother of Dave Maloney, a defenceman with the Rangers. Don Maloney would get into 28 games for the Rangers that season.

Regular season

Season standings

Schedule and results

|- align="center" bgcolor="white"
| 1 || 12 || Philadelphia Flyers || 3 - 3 || 0-0-1
|- align="center" bgcolor="#CCFFCC"
| 2 || 15 || Colorado Rockies || 4 - 1 || 1-0-1
|- align="center" bgcolor="white"
| 3 || 18 || Detroit Red Wings || 3 - 3 || 1-0-2
|- align="center" bgcolor="white"
| 4 || 19 || @ Detroit Red Wings || 2 - 2 || 1-0-3
|- align="center" bgcolor="#FFBBBB"
| 5 || 21 || @ New York Islanders || 5 - 3 || 1-1-3
|- align="center" bgcolor="#CCFFCC"
| 6 || 22 || Toronto Maple Leafs || 5 - 2 || 2-1-3
|- align="center" bgcolor="#CCFFCC"
| 7 || 25 || Vancouver Canucks || 6 - 2 || 3-1-3
|- align="center" bgcolor="#CCFFCC"
| 8 || 28 || @ Montreal Canadiens || 2 - 1 || 4-1-3
|- align="center" bgcolor="#CCFFCC"
| 9 || 29 || Pittsburgh Penguins || 3 - 2 || 5-1-3
|-

|- align="center" bgcolor="#CCFFCC"
| 10 || 2 || @ Colorado Rockies || 3 - 0 || 6-1-3
|- align="center" bgcolor="#CCFFCC"
| 11 || 4 || @ Los Angeles Kings || 7 - 3 || 7-1-3
|- align="center" bgcolor="#CCFFCC"
| 12 || 5 || @ Vancouver Canucks || 5 - 2 || 8-1-3
|- align="center" bgcolor="#FFBBBB"
| 13 || 8 || Minnesota North Stars || 5 - 3 || 8-2-3
|- align="center" bgcolor="#CCFFCC"
| 14 || 11 || @ Pittsburgh Penguins || 2 - 1 || 9-2-3
|- align="center" bgcolor="#FFBBBB"
| 15 || 12 || New York Islanders || 5 - 3 || 9-3-3
|- align="center" bgcolor="#CCFFCC"
| 16 || 15 || Chicago Black Hawks || 8 - 1 || 10-3-3
|- align="center" bgcolor="#CCFFCC"
| 17 || 18 || @ Minnesota North Stars || 7 - 2 || 11-3-3
|- align="center" bgcolor="#FFBBBB"
| 18 || 19 || Atlanta Flames || 3 - 1 || 11-4-3
|- align="center" bgcolor="white"
| 19 || 22 || Toronto Maple Leafs || 3 - 3 || 11-4-4
|- align="center" bgcolor="#CCFFCC"
| 20 || 26 || Washington Capitals || 9 - 4 || 12-4-4
|- align="center" bgcolor="#CCFFCC"
| 21 || 29 || @ Atlanta Flames || 5 - 3 || 13-4-4
|-

|- align="center" bgcolor="#FFBBBB"
| 22 || 2 || @ Toronto Maple Leafs || 5 - 2 || 13-5-4
|- align="center" bgcolor="#FFBBBB"
| 23 || 3 || Boston Bruins || 3 - 2 || 13-6-4
|- align="center" bgcolor="#CCFFCC"
| 24 || 6 || St. Louis Blues || 7 - 4 || 14-6-4
|- align="center" bgcolor="#CCFFCC"
| 25 || 7 || @ Philadelphia Flyers || 5 - 2 || 15-6-4
|- align="center" bgcolor="#FFBBBB"
| 26 || 9 || @ Detroit Red Wings || 5 - 4 || 15-7-4
|- align="center" bgcolor="#FFBBBB"
| 27 || 10 || Philadelphia Flyers || 4 - 0 || 15-8-4
|- align="center" bgcolor="#CCFFCC"
| 28 || 13 || Los Angeles Kings || 8 - 7 || 16-8-4
|- align="center" bgcolor="#FFBBBB"
| 29 || 16 || @ Boston Bruins || 4 - 1 || 16-9-4
|- align="center" bgcolor="#FFBBBB"
| 30 || 17 || Boston Bruins || 4 - 1 || 16-10-4
|- align="center" bgcolor="#CCFFCC"
| 31 || 20 || Buffalo Sabres || 6 - 3 || 17-10-4
|- align="center" bgcolor="#CCFFCC"
| 32 || 22 || Detroit Red Wings || 4 - 2 || 18-10-4
|- align="center" bgcolor="#FFBBBB"
| 33 || 23 || @ New York Islanders || 9 - 4 || 18-11-4
|- align="center" bgcolor="#CCFFCC"
| 34 || 26 || @ Atlanta Flames || 5 - 3 || 19-11-4
|- align="center" bgcolor="#FFBBBB"
| 35 || 28 || @ Philadelphia Flyers || 6 - 5 || 19-12-4
|- align="center" bgcolor="#CCFFCC"
| 36 || 30 || @ Chicago Black Hawks || 5 - 4 || 20-12-4
|- align="center" bgcolor="#FFBBBB"
| 37 || 31 || Atlanta Flames || 6 - 5 || 20-13-4
|-

|- align="center" bgcolor="#CCFFCC"
| 38 || 3 || Montreal Canadiens || 6 - 2 || 21-13-4
|- align="center" bgcolor="#CCFFCC"
| 39 || 5 || Vancouver Canucks || 6 - 4 || 22-13-4
|- align="center" bgcolor="#CCFFCC"
| 40 || 9 || @ St. Louis Blues || 5 - 3 || 23-13-4
|- align="center" bgcolor="#CCFFCC"
| 41 || 10 || @ Colorado Rockies || 5 - 3 || 24-13-4
|- align="center" bgcolor="#CCFFCC"
| 42 || 14 || @ Atlanta Flames || 6 - 4 || 25-13-4
|- align="center" bgcolor="#FFBBBB"
| 43 || 15 || Minnesota North Stars || 8 - 1 || 25-14-4
|- align="center" bgcolor="#CCFFCC"
| 44 || 17 || New York Islanders || 5 - 3 || 26-14-4
|- align="center" bgcolor="#FFBBBB"
| 45 || 20 || @ St. Louis Blues || 3 - 2 || 26-15-4
|- align="center" bgcolor="white"
| 46 || 21 || Philadelphia Flyers || 5 - 5 || 26-15-5
|- align="center" bgcolor="#FFBBBB"
| 47 || 24 || @ Washington Capitals || 5 - 1 || 26-16-5
|- align="center" bgcolor="#CCFFCC"
| 48 || 25 || @ Buffalo Sabres || 5 - 4 || 27-16-5
|- align="center" bgcolor="#CCFFCC"
| 49 || 27 || @ New York Islanders || 7 - 2 || 28-16-5
|- align="center" bgcolor="#CCFFCC"
| 50 || 30 || @ Vancouver Canucks || 5 - 3 || 29-16-5
|- align="center" bgcolor="#FFBBBB"
| 51 || 31 || @ Colorado Rockies || 5 - 4 || 29-17-5
|-

|- align="center" bgcolor="#FFBBBB"
| 52 || 3 || @ Los Angeles Kings || 4 - 2 || 29-18-5
|- align="center" bgcolor="#CCFFCC"
| 53 || 14 || Boston Bruins || 5 - 1 || 30-18-5
|- align="center" bgcolor="#FFBBBB"
| 54 || 15 || @ Buffalo Sabres || 4 - 3 || 30-19-5
|- align="center" bgcolor="#CCFFCC"
| 55 || 17 || @ Philadelphia Flyers || 4 - 2 || 31-19-5
|- align="center" bgcolor="white"
| 56 || 18 || Washington Capitals || 6 - 6 || 31-19-6
|- align="center" bgcolor="#CCFFCC"
| 57 || 21 || St. Louis Blues || 7 - 3 || 32-19-6
|- align="center" bgcolor="#CCFFCC"
| 58 || 24 || @ Toronto Maple Leafs || 4 - 2 || 33-19-6
|- align="center" bgcolor="#CCFFCC"
| 59 || 25 || New York Islanders || 3 - 2 || 34-19-6
|- align="center" bgcolor="#FFBBBB"
| 60 || 27 || @ St. Louis Blues || 4 - 1 || 34-20-6
|- align="center" bgcolor="white"
| 61 || 28 || @ Minnesota North Stars || 4 - 4 || 34-20-7
|-

|- align="center" bgcolor="white"
| 62 || 3 || Buffalo Sabres || 2 - 2 || 34-20-8
|- align="center" bgcolor="#FFBBBB"
| 63 || 4 || Toronto Maple Leafs || 4 - 2 || 34-21-8
|- align="center" bgcolor="#CCFFCC"
| 64 || 7 || Colorado Rockies || 5 - 3 || 35-21-8
|- align="center" bgcolor="#CCFFCC"
| 65 || 10 || @ Montreal Canadiens || 6 - 3 || 36-21-8
|- align="center" bgcolor="#CCFFCC"
| 66 || 11 || Chicago Black Hawks || 5 - 2 || 37-21-8
|- align="center" bgcolor="#FFBBBB"
| 67 || 14 || Atlanta Flames || 6 - 4 || 37-22-8
|- align="center" bgcolor="#CCFFCC"
| 68 || 15 || @ Boston Bruins || 7 - 4 || 38-22-8
|- align="center" bgcolor="#FFBBBB"
| 69 || 17 || @ New York Islanders || 5 - 2 || 38-23-8
|- align="center" bgcolor="#FFBBBB"
| 70 || 18 || Pittsburgh Penguins || 5 - 1 || 38-24-8
|- align="center" bgcolor="white"
| 71 || 20 || @ Washington Capitals || 2 - 2 || 38-24-9
|- align="center" bgcolor="#CCFFCC"
| 72 || 21 || @ Chicago Black Hawks || 7 - 6 || 39-24-9
|- align="center" bgcolor="#FFBBBB"
| 73 || 25 || Montreal Canadiens || 1 - 0 || 39-25-9
|- align="center" bgcolor="white"
| 74 || 27 || Philadelphia Flyers || 4 - 4 || 39-25-10
|- align="center" bgcolor="#FFBBBB"
| 75 || 28 || @ Pittsburgh Penguins || 7 - 1 || 39-26-10
|-

|- align="center" bgcolor="#FFBBBB"
| 76 || 1 || @ Philadelphia Flyers || 7 - 3 || 39-27-10
|- align="center" bgcolor="#CCFFCC"
| 77 || 2 || Los Angeles Kings || 5 - 4 || 40-27-10
|- align="center" bgcolor="white"
| 78 || 4 || Atlanta Flames || 3 - 3 || 40-27-11
|- align="center" bgcolor="#FFBBBB"
| 79 || 6 || @ Atlanta Flames || 9 - 2 || 40-28-11
|- align="center" bgcolor="#FFBBBB"
| 80 || 8 || New York Islanders || 5 - 2 || 40-29-11
|-

Season summary
 February 25: During a win against the Islanders, Ulf Nilsson was injured on a hip check by Denis Potvin. In the years to come, this would serve as the origin to the infamous "Potvin Sucks" chant at Madison Square Garden.

Playoffs

Stanley Cup Finals
The Rangers faced the defending champion Montreal Canadiens, who were making their fourth straight Stanley Cup Finals appearance. It was the Rangers' first appearance in the finals since the 1972 Stanley Cup Finals. The Canadiens would win the best-of-seven series four games to one, to win their fourth consecutive Stanley Cup.

Key:  Win  Loss

Player statistics
Skaters

Goaltenders

†Denotes player spent time with another team before joining Rangers. Stats reflect time with Rangers only.
‡Traded mid-season. Stats reflect time with Rangers only.

Awards and records

Transactions

Draft picks
New York's picks at the 1978 NHL Amateur Draft in Montreal, Quebec, Canada.

References

External links
 Rangers on Hockey Database

New York Rangers seasons
New York Rangers
New York Rangers
New York Rangers
New York Rangers
Madison Square Garden
1970s in Manhattan